D'Joun Smith (born September 23, 1992) is a former American football cornerback. He played college football at Florida Atlantic and was drafted in the third round of the 2015 NFL Draft by the Indianapolis Colts. He also spent a season with the Tennessee Titans and Orlando Apollos.

Early years
Smith attended American High School in Miami, Florida. As a senior, he had 75 tackles, seven interceptions, two touchdowns and 613 all-purpose yards.

College career
Smith played at Florida Atlantic University from 2011 to 2014. He played in every game as a true freshman and became a starter his sophomore year in 2012. In his three years as a starter, Smith had nine interceptions.

Professional career

Indianapolis Colts
Smith was drafted in the third round (65th overall) of the 2015 NFL draft by the Indianapolis Colts. Before the start of the 2015 season, he was placed on injured reserve, with a designation to return. On November 16, Smith was activated from injured reserve. Smith was placed on season-ending injured reserve on December 24. He appeared in 4 games in 2015, recording 1 tackle.

On September 2, 2016, Smith was waived/injured by the Colts and placed on injured reserve. On September 12, he reached an injury settlement with the Colts, and was released.

Detroit Lions
On September 30, 2016, Smith was signed to the Detroit Lions' practice squad. He was released by the Lions on November 10, 2016.

Tennessee Titans
On November 29, 2016, Smith was signed to the Titans' practice squad. On December 21, 2016, he was promoted to the active roster.

On September 2, 2017, Smith was waived by the Titans.

Orlando Apollos
On September 14, 2018, Smith signed with Orlando Apollos of the Alliance of American Football, eventually making the final roster for the 2019 AAF season. He was waived on February 19, 2019.

Baltimore Brigade
On April 3, 2019, Smith was assigned to the Baltimore Brigade. He was reassigned on April 14, 2019.

References

External links
Florida Atlantic Owls bio

1992 births
Living people
American Senior High School (Miami-Dade County, Florida) alumni
Players of American football from Miami
American football cornerbacks
Florida Atlantic Owls football players
Indianapolis Colts players
Detroit Lions players
Tennessee Titans players
Orlando Apollos players
Baltimore Brigade players